Petar Jovanović (born 12 July 1982) is a Serbian professional footballer who plays as a defender for Sloboda Užice.

Club career
In the summer of 2005, Jovanović moved to Romania and signed with Liga I newcomers Vaslui. He spent the next seven years at the club, including loan spells to Mladenovac, Politehnica Iași, Sevojno, and Sloboda Užice. In June 2012, Jovanović was acquired by newly promoted Liga I side CSMS Iași. He subsequently moved to Serbian First League club Jedinstvo Užice in the 2013 winter transfer window.

In July 2013, Jovanović signed for Serbian SuperLiga side Radnički Niš, alongside his former Vaslui teammate Marko Ljubinković. He later returned to Romania and signed with Liga I club Universitatea Cluj in June 2014. However, they suffered relegation that season.

In the summer of 2015, Jovanović made a return to Serbia and joined Voždovac. He then spent a year with Rad (2016) and Čukarički (2017). In January 2018, Jovanović signed with Mladost Lučani. He also briefly played for Zlatibor Čajetina in late 2019, before returning to Mladost Lučani in early 2020.

Career statistics

Honours
Vaslui
 UEFA Intertoto Cup: 2008
Universitatea Cluj
 Cupa României: Runner-up 2014–15
Mladost Lučani
 Serbian Cup: Runner-up 2017–18

References

External links
 
 
 

1982 births
Living people
Sportspeople from Tuzla
Serbs of Bosnia and Herzegovina
Association football defenders
Bosnia and Herzegovina footballers
FK Radnički Klupci players
FK Čukarički players
FK Sloboda Užice players
FC Vaslui players
OFK Mladenovac players
FC Politehnica Iași (1945) players
FK Sevojno players
FC Politehnica Iași (2010) players
FK Jedinstvo Užice players
FK Radnički Niš players
FC Universitatea Cluj players
FK Voždovac players
FK Rad players
FK Mladost Lučani players
FK Zlatibor Čajetina players
Serbian First League players
Serbian SuperLiga players
Liga I players
Bosnia and Herzegovina expatriate footballers
Expatriate footballers in Serbia
Bosnia and Herzegovina expatriate sportspeople in Serbia
Expatriate footballers in Romania
Bosnia and Herzegovina expatriate sportspeople in Romania